Dissodactylus is a genus of pea crabs in the family Pinnotheridae. There are at least 20 described species in Dissodactylus.

Species
These 20 species belong to the genus Dissodactylus:

 Dissodactylus borradailei M. J. Rathbun, 1918
 Dissodactylus crinitichelis Moreira, 1901
 Dissodactylus encopei
 Dissodactylus glasselli Rioja, 1944
 Dissodactylus juvenalis Bouvier
 Dissodactylus latus Griffith, 1987
 Dissodactylus lockingtoni Glassell, 1935
 Dissodactylus mellitae (M. J. Rathbun, 1900) (sand-dollar pea crab)
 Dissodactylus meyerabichi Bott, 1955
 Dissodactylus nitidus Smith, 1870
 Dissodactylus pelagicus (Aikawa, 1933)
 Dissodactylus pinna (Aikawa, 1933)
 Dissodactylus primitivus Bouvier, 1917
 Dissodactylus schmitti H.Griffith, 1987
 Dissodactylus singularis (Aikawa, 1933)
 Dissodactylus speciosus (Aikawa, 1933)
 Dissodactylus tokyoensis (Aikawa, 1933)
 Dissodactylus unicornis (Aikawa, 1933)
 Dissodactylus usufructus Griffith
 Dissodactylus xantusi Glassell, 1936

References

Further reading

External links

 

Decapods
Articles created by Qbugbot